Marcos Ariel de Paula (born 19 December 1983) is a Brazilian football player. He plays as a striker.

Career
De Paula was spotted by Chievo scouts while playing for Bauru in the 2001 Torneo di Viareggio. He was loaned to A.C. Milan for the 2001–02 season. He played for Milan Primavera during the 2002 Torneo di Viareggio, where he scored 4 goals Despite his good performance, the club decided not to sign him. De Paula made his professional debut in Italy, as a Chievo Verona player, during the 2002–03 season. He was later sent out on loan for nine consecutive seasons to a number of minor league (Lega Pro Prima Divisione and Lega Pro Seconda Divisione) teams; after a successful stint with Foligno in 2008–09, he finally managed to join Chievo's first team for the 2009–10 season, during which he also scored his first Serie A goals.

After only three appearances for Chievo in the 2010–11 season he joined Padova on loan until 30 June 2011.

References

External links
Gazzetta dello Sport career profile

1983 births
Living people
Brazilian footballers
Brazilian expatriate footballers
Footballers from São Paulo (state)
Serie A players
Serie B players
Expatriate footballers in Italy
A.C. ChievoVerona players
Benevento Calcio players
Calcio Foggia 1920 players
S.S.D. Pro Sesto players
A.S.D. Martina Calcio 1947 players
A.C. Belluno 1905 players
Calcio Padova players
S.S.C. Bari players
F.C. Pro Vercelli 1892 players
F.C. Lumezzane V.G.Z. A.S.D. players
Association football forwards
Imolese Calcio 1919 players
Brazilian expatriate sportspeople in Italy
People from Bariri